Anthony J. Bova (August 21, 1917 – October 15, 1973) was a professional football player for the Pittsburgh Steelers during the 1940s. He graduated from The Kiski School and then Saint Francis University, located in Loretto, Pennsylvania, in 1943. He was 6'1" and weighed 190 pounds when he played for the Steelers during World War II, when they temporarily merged with the Philadelphia Eagles (in 1943) and Chicago Cardinals (in 1944) to form the "Steagles" and "Card-Pitt". He played end, halfback, and quarterback during his career from 1942 to 1947. In 1942 he also played left end on defense and in 1947 scored a safety. In 1943 Bova led the NFL in average gain per completed pass in 1943, netting 419 yards in 19 completed aerials. In 1942 he wore numbers 31 and 41 and in 1943 number 85.

He was also blind in one eye and partially blind in the other. He joined the United States Navy during World War II and reported for duty in February 1943 as a Seabee. He was soon discharged from the navy due to his vision.

Bova is also listed on the NFL honor roll, located at the Pro Football Hall of Fame, which lists the over 1,000 NFL personnel who served in the military during World War II.

He is buried in the Mt. Royal Cemetery in Glenshaw, Pennsylvania.

Notes

1917 births
1973 deaths
Players of American football from Pittsburgh
Saint Francis Red Flash football players
Card-Pitt players
Pittsburgh Steelers players
Steagles players and personnel
Burials in Pennsylvania
The Kiski School alumni
Military personnel from Pittsburgh
United States Navy sailors
Seabees
United States Navy personnel of World War II
American disabled sportspeople